Idol (also known as SuperStar in some countries) is a reality television singing competition format created by British television producer Simon Fuller and developed by Fremantle. The format began in 2001 with the British television series Pop Idol; its first adaptation was the Polish series Idol in 2002. It has since become the world's most widely watched television franchise, as well as one of the most successful entertainment formats, adapted in over 56 regions around the world, with its various versions broadcast to 150 countries with a worldwide audience of roughly 3.2 billion people.

Each season, the series aims to find the most outstanding unsigned solo recording artist (or "idol") in a region. Originally aimed for pop singers, the series has since evolved to accept singers from different genres of music, such as rock, R&B, and country. Through a series of mass auditions, a group of finalists are selected by a panel of judges (which usually consists of artists and record producers) who offer critiques on their performances. The finalists then advance to the weekly live shows. On each live show, the contestants all sing, the television audience votes (by telephone, SMS Internet, and via apps), and then the contestant who receives the fewest votes gets eliminated. The final episode is the grand finale episode, when usually two, but sometimes three or four, finalists are left, and the contestant who gets the largest number of votes is declared the winner. The winner receives a recording contract, monetary prizes, and a title as their nation's "Idol", "SuperStar" or "Star". Sometimes one or more of the runners-up get recording contracts as well.

The various series have launched the careers of a number of highly successful recording artists around the world, including Idol winners Will Young of the United Kingdom, Kelly Clarkson, Carrie Underwood, Scotty McCreery, Fantasia, Ruben Studdard, David Cook, and Phillip Phillips of the United States, Kurt Nilsen of Norway, Ryan Malcolm and Kalan Porter of Canada, Guy Sebastian of Australia, and Elvis Blue of South Africa. Contestants who did not win but have still gone on to prominence include Anthony Callea, Ricki-Lee Coulter and Jessica Mauboy of Australia, Jacob Hoggard and Carly Rae Jepsen of Canada, and Clay Aiken, Chris Daughtry, Gabby Barrett, Lauren Alaina and Adam Lambert of the United States, among many others. Some Idol contestants have also achieved success in acting and musical theater such as Melissa O'Neil of Canada, and most notably Academy Award winner Jennifer Hudson of American Idol.

Origin and background
In 2001, British talent manager and television producer Simon Fuller created the British television series Pop Idol. The series was developed by production company Fremantle and was broadcast on ITV on 6 October 2001. Fuller, along with television producer Nigel Lythgoe, was inspired to create the series by the New Zealand television series Popstars, which was adopted in the United Kingdom as Popstars in January 2001. The first series of Pop Idol proved to be more popular than Popstars, in part due to the chemistry of the judges and the success of its first winner Will Young.

Pop Idols success led to an interest for adaptations in other countries. Before selling the format, Fuller reached out for an out-of-court settlement with Popstars creator Jonathan Dowling, in which international versions of Idols will be prohibited to use the prefix Pop in their local titles. As such, Poland, the first country to adapt the format, named their version as simply Idol. Idol was launched in 2002, months after the first series of Pop Idol ended.

Fuller, Lythgoe, and Pop Idol judge Simon Cowell attempted to sell the format in the United States in 2001, but the idea was met with poor response from major networks. Elisabeth Murdoch, daughter of News Corporation chairman Rupert Murdoch, persuaded her father to buy the rights for an American adaptation. The series, American Idol: The Search for a Superstar, debuted on the Fox network on 11 June 2002. American Idol went on to become the all-time most dominant show in the U.S. TV ratings, due to the popularity of the judges (particularly Simon Cowell) and its contestants, which were led by its first winner, Kelly Clarkson.

The success brought by American Idol led to even more adaptations in other countries, where the Dutch Idols became the top television series in the Netherlands during its airing.

There has been a global version of the franchise, called World Idol. The show was a television special, where winners of national Idol shows will compete against each other. The special was won by Kurt Nilsen, a singer from Norway. A current World version of Idol acts as a YouTube channel, called Idols Global. The channel uploads clips of Idol shows from around the world. The channel currently has over 1 million subscribers. There are many more channels like this. Additionally, many individual Idol shows have their own YouTube channels.

Concept
The show is a reality television singing competition where the winner is selected by the audience voting. The show combines a number of elements previously used by other shows such as Popstars – mass auditioning, the search of a new star, and the use of a judging panel that critiques the audtioners' performance and selects the contestants. An important element is audience participation, where the audience may vote by telephone or text to decide which contestant can proceed further each week and ultimately win. According to the show creator, Simon Fuller, "the interactivity was important because this would allow the audience to tell me who they liked best and this, in turn, would indicate to me who would have the most fans and eventually sell the most music and become the biggest stars." To this is added "the drama of backstories and the real-life soap opera of the unfolding real-time events" as the show is presented as a live competition event which drew "more from a sporting concept of true competition".

Format

Hosts
Each show has at least one host that directs the show, introduces the singers and delivers the results of each episode including the finale. While some countries have one host (Ryan Seacrest in American Idol, Boy William in Indonesian Idol, Dominic Bowden in New Zealand Idol, ProVerb in Idols SA, IK Osakioduwa in Nigerian Idol), most shows have two co-hosts. As well as judges, some countries have adopted new members to the hosting/jury party.

Judges/jury
A preselected panel of music industry representatives tour some, if not all audition cities (depending on which show) to observe and advance those auditioning throughout the show up to and including the Grand Finale. The judges offer critiques and/or advice after each contestant performance, which can be positive or negative; Nouvelle Star 4 for the first time in any country introduced a red and blue "score card" type system where the jury award a blue "positive" or red "negative" rating and in Nouvelle Star 14, they introduced a scoring system where the jury give a point from a range of 1 to 10 after every mottoshow performance.

As many as five stable jury members have appeared in any one Idol season (Idol Poland 3, Indonesian Idol 9), though some versions offer "guest judges" or special musical guests on the program to also offer advice.

The judges of some shows gain a lot of popularity outside of the show as well as the contestants, due to their being collectively known to have a "caustic" or raw & blunt attitude towards contestants' performances, notably Simon Cowell, Kyle Sandilands, Kuba Wojewódzki, Dieter Bohlen, Ian "Dicko" Dickson, Paul Moss, Ahmad Dhani, Titi DJ, Zack Werner, Wyngard Tracy and Anu Malik amongst others.

Performance stages
Auditions are held in numerous places in any particular region or country that give most people (audition entry is bound by certain legal requirements such as age and citizenship for example) the chance to sing in front of musical/television producers and if successful, they advance to a recorded televised audition where the show "judges" advance up to 300 people in some countries to the next round.

The Theatre round is where a specially selected group of auditioners from all regional auditions converge (always in the host city) to perform in three sub stages: a chorus line in groups of 10 where free song choices are allowed, a trio (or less commonly a duo or quartet) where contestants must memorize a preselected song to perform and choreograph together, and finally a solo a cappella round where contestants sing a song of their own choice without musical backing in front of friends, family, judges & fellow contestants.

Each stage of the theatre round, a number of contestants are eliminated and sent home by the judges, though in some countries there have been very few contestants brought back during the Wildcards show or by the disqualification or resignation of another contestant.

In American Idol, this stage was expanded to five stages (three in Hollywood, two in Las Vegas) from seasons 10 to 12.

The semi-finals occurs usually live or pre-recorded (in some countries) where contestants sing in a television studio fully televised; again judges give critiques but beginning at this stage, home viewers vote via telephone and SMS (and in some countries other voting mechanisms including via Internet or via Red Button) who they want to stay in the competition. During the "semi-final" weeks, contestants receive a workshop tuition with a vocal coach to prepare their song of choice. The format started out with contestants only singing along to a piano, though other instruments & even a live band have been introduced to some versions.

An average semi-final usually consists of 18 to 50 contestants where they either perform in an even group of contestants (three groups of ten for example) or in a "heat" type semi-final where the contestants sing every week until all finalists have been chosen. During the format, a Wildcards feature was introduced which re-introduced past semi-finalists to receive a second chance to become a finalist, in some shows – the judges sometimes pick one or more contestants to advance as well as the viewers' vote. As of late, live audiences have been incorporated into the semi-final round.

A results show of the semi-finals usually airs either a few hours after the performance show or the night after where the results are given. Three or four contestants are told that they may have received highest votes, though only a selected two or three are put through to the finals.

The Live shows (a.k.a. Mottoshows, Spectacular shows or theme shows) are an elaborate and spectacular version of the semi-final. There is a weekly theme on which contestants must base their song choices, such as "80s Hits" or "Hits of Elton John" for example. In a bid to counter sagging ratings, contestants on Australian Idol were allowed to bring instruments on stage with them and had the opportunity to sing original material from the 2006 season, a world first. Since then America and Canada have followed Australia's lead. Again a results show follows the show; this time it may include group performances, musical guests or extra footage of the contestants' time on the show. The contestant/s with the lowest polled votes leaves the competition. The live shows continue until there are only two contestants left in the competition or three contestants in some cases.

The Grand Finale occurs when there are two (or, rarely, three and only once so far four) contestants left in the competition. This is the pinnacle of the entire series and often highest rated show; also for some countries, it is venued in a prestigious location (American Idol: Dolby Theatre/Nokia Theatre, Canadian Idol: John Bassett Theatre, Australian Idol: Sydney Opera House, Philippine Idol: Araneta Coliseum, Indonesian Idol: Ecovention Ocean Ecopark/Hall D2 JIExpo, Idol Sweden: Ericsson Globe, Singapore Idol: Singapore Indoor Stadium). In this final stage a specially awarded song is sung by both remaining contestants which is ultimately slated to be released as the winner's debut single though recently in some countries this has been phased out.

During the extended results show, there are usually group performances and/or special musical guests. Also, it has the best moments of the series which leads up to the announcement of the winner, which is determined by the highest number of votes. When that happens, he or she will perform an encore of the coronation single which sometimes includes pyrotechnics/fireworks.

While the show's premise is to find one winner with promises of a recording deal and other frugal benefits, the Idol series often has several contestants who go onto the same route of fame, whether they be finalists, semi-finalists, or even auditioners. Key examples of this from American Idol include Clay Aiken (second place, season 2) and Chris Daughtry (fourth place, season 5, through his band Daughtry), who have each outsold all American Idol winners except Kelly Clarkson and Carrie Underwood; Jennifer Hudson (seventh place, season 3), who would later win the Academy Award for Best Supporting Actress; and William Hung, who turned his off-key season 3 audition into a recording career and has outsold some finalists.

Releases
Often, a studio compilation album and/or a CD single is made to promote the show. In some cases, DVDs of highlights of the show will be released. While these releases have sold well in countries including the United States and Australia, many countries did not release CDs after the first series.

Since season 6, American Idol has sold only promotional downloads instead of CDs. For season 6, it sold studio-recorded MP3 and performance video downloads of the finalists on its website; no CDs were sold prior to the post-Idol releases of winner Jordin Sparks and runner-up Blake Lewis. For season 7, audio and video downloads are sold exclusively through the iTunes Store, which became a sponsor in that season; the iTunes downloads have included audio of all semi-finalist performances, studio recordings and performance videos for all finalists, videos of finalist group performances, and audio and video performances from the Idol Gives Back episode.

Media/sponsorship
Sony Music is the general record company associated and affiliated with the Idols format in most countries, though countries like Iceland, Vietnam and Kazakhstan have affiliate labels as they do not have a local Sony Music subsidiary. FremantleMedia and Sony Music were related through common parent Bertelsmann, which owns 90.4% of FremantleMedia's immediate parent RTL Group and previously owned 50% of joint venture Sony BMG from 2004 to 2008. Since 2011, Universal Music Group replaced Sony Music Entertainment as the general record company associated and affiliated with the Idols format in most countries.

Idols around the world

International versions
 Currently airing franchise
 Franchise with an upcoming season
 Franchise with an unknown status
 Franchise no longer aired

Winner competitions

Themes
A notable commonality among Idol-format shows is the theme logo & intro style.
Many different versions of the Idol logo and show intro have been created since Idol's inception in June 2001.

Logo
The basic plan for the logo is an oval with the particular show's name centered in custom lettering based on a common font (Kaufmann). Mostly the name of the show is written horizontally, however occasionally part of the name is angled upwards.

The original Pop Idol logo featured an enhanced star in the logo. The star also appeared briefly on the American Idol logo, but was scrapped early in the Season 1 auditions.

The logo for some countries comes with an underline on the words SuperStar, or Idol, such as Deutschland sucht den Superstar, Hrvatski Idol, Hrvatska traži zvijezdu, Super Star, Hay Superstar, Nouvelle Star, Narodniy Artist, Super Idol, and Pinoy Idol (which also has a raised word). Türkstar has the only Idol logo to not use the common font style. As part of a relaunch after the first season, the French Nouvelle Star logo was changed to purple – the only logo to depart from the standard blue palette until Arab SuperStar season five had changed to the same color scheme also.

'Intro' sequence

Idolatry (2001–2005)
The original version of the Idol intro was created by Liquid TV Graphics in London which started with the dark blue Idol logo descending on the screen. A CGI human figure appears, with arms raised, intended to be the 'Idol' of the show's name. While the Idol figure sings, and then walks, images of guitars, microphones, cameras, and airplanes flow by, representing the life of a superstar. During this, the gender of the figure alternates between male and female. Finally, the figure is again in front of the Idol logo, raising hands in victory. The American Idol intro was altered each season from Season 2, including new sound effects and replacing the jet airplanes with waving flags. The flag concept was also used in the Indian Idol intro, as well as displays of famous national landmarks appearing in the first scene.

Tunnel (2005–2012)
In 2005, a new version of the Idol intro was created by Aerodrome Pictures in Los Angeles which first appeared on the Season 4 premiere of American Idol. The intro starts with the Idol logo without the dark blue background spinning in the American and Canadian version while the other Idol formats only glows and sparkles then the logo zooms in featuring a long section of the CGI Idol figure riding an open elevator past large vertical screens and displays and then walking down a stylized tunnel to a stage, where the figure starts to perform. On this basic template, the American and Canadian versions are customized, with past Idol winners appearing on the screens in the American version, while the Canadian version's screens feature Canadian landmarks. The American & Canadian versions last for 30 seconds; the new intro sequences for other Idol shows only last 15 seconds, with no customization and instead of the logo being 'stuck down' to the outside of the tunnel, it is pasted over the top. Also, the intro sequence for Nouvelle Star has a purple and blue color scheme instead of the standard light blue/light green.

Gyroscope (2008–2011)
In 2008, a new version of the Idol intro was created and introduced by BLT & Associates in Los Angeles on the American Idol 7th season finals. The intro starts with the Idol logo spinning behind a gyroscope then features real male and female Idol figures passing horizontal and arc displays then walking to an arena where the two figures start to perform. Finally, only one figure raises his/her hands in victory in front of a huge arc display then zooms out to the atmosphere and to space, where the title of the show zooms out in front of planet Earth. The ending title of this intro is similar to the Universal Pictures logo of 1990 (for the starry background) and in 2012 (for the earth model). The American, Australian, Canadian, Croatian, Latin American and Swedish versions are customized by featuring their past Idol winners in the horizontal and arc displays and last for 30 seconds. Other versions are also customized and last for 30 seconds without featuring their past winners. Some of the Idols versions didn't use the Gyroscope theme in the intro, such as Indian Idol and Deutschland sucht den SuperStar (Germany). Indian Idol used the Tunnel theme for the intro from 2007 to 2010 and in next season after that, 2012, Indian Idol used the 'Hall of Idols' theme, while Deutschland sucht den SuperStar used the 'Tunnel' theme for the intro until 2012, until in 2013 till present, Deutschland sucht den SuperStar uses its own intro. Only the French version lasts for 20 seconds.

Hall of Idols (2011–present)
In 2011, a new version of the Idol intro was created once again by Aerodrome Pictures in Los Angeles which first appeared on the Season 10 premiere of American Idol. The intro starts with a stage being spotted under a spotlight from the sky. Then, a stylized bridge leading towards a screen is shown. Winners of Idol, as well as notable alumni from past seasons are shown on the screen. The camera turns to a pyramid-like shape blooming and a CGI figure appears. Depending on the figure's gender in the intro, the figure would yield a different action in front of the American Idol logo and the huge "IDOL" word string (in "American Idol" and "Indonesian Idol" (not shown anymore since Season 9) but not in "Arab Idol"): the male figure raises his hand in victory and strikes a pose while the female figure raises her arms in victory before bowing down. Sometimes, a female figure will appear.

New Idol (2013–2021)
In 2013, a new version of the Idol Intro was created on the Season 10 premiere of Deutschland sucht den Superstar. The new intro begins with a mysterious person with a microphone at the mouth. As previous posting Intro male and female talents are displayed. They sing and dance on the big stage. In the meantime, always a person who appears followed a path. On that path along former candidates from earlier seasons are displayed on screens.

Gyroscope 2.0 (2014)
In 2014, a new version of the Idol intro was created by The Mill in Los Angeles which first appeared on the Season 13 premiere of American Idol. The intro starts with a hole opening up. Then, the gyroscope logo comes out of the hole. A crowd cheers in a stage. Finally, the gyroscope logo appears with the Roman numerals "XIII" below the logo. The intro was also used in the South African version of Idol.

Idol on Street (2015)
In 2015, a new version of the Idol intro was created and appeared on the Season 14 premiere of American Idol.

The Farewell of Idol (2016)
In 2016, a new version of the Idol intro was created and appeared on the Season 15 premiere of American Idol.

Hall of Idol 2.0 (2016–present)
In 2016, a new version of the Idol intro was created and appeared on the Season 5 premiere of Idols in Netherland.

ABC's Idol (2018–present)
American Idols revival on ABC was accompanied with a Disney-like intro. It starts with several shooting stars falling from the sky before curving up and circling the neon American Idol logo with fireworks in the background at the end. This opening is much shorter than the previously used intros. It acts as an integrated part of a longer opening introduction in each episode rather than a standalone opening theme as in previous seasons.

In popular culture

 American Dreamz – a Universal Pictures film, a satire on pop entertainment, including American Idol
 From Justin to Kelly – a 20th Century Studios film, starring Kelly Clarkson and Justin Guarini, winner and runner-up of American Idol 2002
 Instant Star – a Canadian television series, following the life of a winner of a singing contest
 Realiti – a Malaysian television series, features the lives and secrets of contestants of a fictional reality TV singing competition
 Vina Bilang Cinta (Vina Says Love) – an Indonesian film, starring Indonesian Idol 2004 runner-up Delon Thamrin
 Idolos de Juventud – a Telemundo television series, following the lives of the contestants and promoters of a fictional reality TV singing competition
 Rock Rivals – British drama series on ITV, based on a fictional Pop Idol–style show.
 Britain's Got the Pop Factor... and Possibly a New Celebrity Jesus Christ Soapstar Superstar Strictly on Ice – British spoof of Pop Idol / The X Factor by comedian Peter Kay, screened on Channel 4, featuring the original Pop Idol judging panel (minus Simon Cowell).
 Táo Idol/Gặp nhau cuối năm 2011 – Gặp nhau cuối năm is an annual comedy produced by Vietnam Television. In 2011, the show was partially based on the format of Idol and Top Model series. It also has its own Idol's Gyroscope intro.

See also
 List of television show franchises

Notes and references

Notes

 Citizens of Macedonia were eligible to participate in the third season.
 Citizens of Hong Kong, Macau, and Taiwan are eligible to participate throughout the series.
 Citizens of Wallonia and Québec were eligible to participate in the first season.
 Citizens of Austria and Switzerland are eligible to participate throughout the series.
 Citizens of Cyprus were eligible to participate in Super Idol.
 Citizens of Belarus and Ukraine were eligible to participate in the first and second season.
 Citizens of Puerto Rico were eligible to participate in the eighth season.
 Countries whose citizens were eligible to participate include all the member states of the Arab League.
 Countries whose citizens were eligible to participate include: Botswana, Burundi, Comoros, Djibouti, Ethiopia, Eritrea, Kenya, Lesotho, Madagascar, Malawi, Mauritius, Mozambique, Namibia, Réunion (a part of France), Rwanda, Seychelles, Somalia, Swaziland, Tanzania, Uganda, Zambia and Zimbabwe.
 Countries whose citizens were eligible to participate include all of the Latin American countries, with the exception of Brazil.
 Countries whose citizens were eligible to participate include: Benin, Burkina Faso, Cape Verde, Côte d'Ivoire, Gambia, Ghana, Guinea, Guinea-Bissau, Liberia, Mali, Mauritania, Niger, Nigeria, Saint Helena, Senegal, Sierra Leone and Togo.
 Winners of Indian Idol, Indonesian Idol, Malaysian Idol, Philippine Idol, Singapore Idol, SuperStar KZ, and Vietnam Idol participated in Asian Idol, in which the winner was determined the greatest percentage of votes.
 Winners of inaugural seasons of American Idol, Australian Idol, Canadian Idol, Deutschland sucht den Superstar, Idool, Idols (Dutch version), Idols (South African version), Idol (Polish version), Idol (Norwegian version), Pop Idol, and SuperStar (Arab version) participated in World Idol, in which the winner was determined by the most collective points given by each of the other participating countries (similar to the Eurovision Song Contest).

References

 
Reality television series franchises